The 1933 Major League Baseball season was contested from April 12 to October 7, 1933. The New York Giants and Washington Senators were the regular season champions of the National League and American League, respectively. The Giants then defeated the Senators in the World Series, four games to one.

The season featured eight players hitting for the cycle, tied for the most of any single major league season. It was also the last season before the Senators and Philadelphia Athletics became perennial American League cellar-dwellers. The Senators would have only four more winning seasons in Washington D.C. and would not return to the World Series until 1965 as the Minnesota Twins, while the Athletics would have only four winning seasons until moving to Oakland in 1968, winning only 40.2 percent of their games over 34 seasons.

Awards and honors

Most Valuable Player
Jimmie Foxx, Philadelphia Athletics (AL)
Carl Hubbell, New York Giants (NL)

Statistical leaders

1 American League Triple Crown Award Winner

2 National League Triple Crown Award Winner

Standings

American League

National League

Postseason

Bracket

Managers

American League

National League

Home Field Attendance

Events
On August 29, the Chicago Cubs team that played the Brooklyn Dodgers featured Billy Herman playing second base, Babe Herman playing right field and Leroy Herrmann pitching.

References

External links
1933 Major League Baseball season schedule at Baseball Reference

 
Major League Baseball seasons